The Comic Art Convention was an American comic book fan convention held annually New York City, New York, over Independence Day weekend from 1968 through 1983, except for 1977, when it was held in Philadelphia, Pennsylvania, and 1978 to 1979, when editions of the convention were held in both New York and Philadelphia. The first large-scale comics convention, and one of the largest gatherings of its kind until the Comic-Con International in San Diego, California, it grew into a major trade and fan convention. It was founded by Phil Seuling, a Brooklyn, New York City, teacher, who later developed the concept of comic-book direct marketing, which led to the rise to the modern comic book store.

The New York Comic Art Convention's growth in popularity coincided with the increasing media attention on comics that had been building since the mid-1960s, feeding off the then novel notions of comics being a subject worthy of serious critical study and collectibility.

History
Circa 1961, enterprising fans including Jerry Bails, Shel Dorf, Bernie Bubnis, and future Marvel Comics editor-in-chief Roy Thomas began following the pattern of the long-established science fiction fandom by publishing fanzines, corresponding with one another and with comic-book editors (most notably DC Comics' Julius Schwartz), and eventually arranging informal and later professional, commercial conventions. Among the first were the 1964 Tri-State Con (a.k.a. the New York Comicon) and that same year's precursor to the Detroit Triple Fan Fair (officially established in 1965).

As Seuling described his convention's genesis, "In 1964, about a hundred people found themselves in a New York City union meeting hall, a large open room with wooden folding chairs, looking around at each other oddly, surprised, not really knowing what they were there for, a bit sheepish, waiting for whatever was going to take place to begin. ... It was the first comics convention ever [and t]hat one-day assembly ... grew step by step into an annual tradition in New York and then elsewhere." In 1965, the Academy of Comic-Book Fans and Collectors hosted a convention at New York's Broadway Central Hotel, continuing that tradition in 1966 and 1967. The so-called "Academy Cons" featured such industry professionals as Otto Binder, Bill Finger, Gardner Fox, Mort Weisinger, James Warren, Roy Thomas, Gil Kane, Stan Lee, Bill Everett, Carmine Infantino, and Julius Schwartz.

As Seuling told it, "In 1968, I became involved in [staging] my first convention. The following year began the current series called the Comic Art Convention". (The 1968 show, officially known as the International Convention of Comic Book Art, was co-produced with SCARP, the short-lived Society for Comic Art Research and Preservation, Inc.) Guests of honor at the 1968 show were Stan Lee and Burne Hogarth

The 1969 convention, the first official Comic Art Convention, was held Independence Day weekend at the Statler Hilton Hotel in New York City, and the guest of honor was Hal Foster. Admittance to the convention cost $3.50 for a three-day ticket, with daily passes at $1.50. Admittance was free with a hotel room rental, which cost $15-and-up per day.

The final three years of the 1961-1969 Alley Awards, sponsored by Alter Ego magazine and the Academy of Comic-Book Fans and Collectors, were presented at the Comic Art Convention. After the demise of the Alley, later years featured the Goethe Awards (later renamed the "Comic Fan Art Awards").

In 1973, Seuling persuaded Dr. Fredric Wertham, author of the industry-changing 1954 book Seduction of the Innocent, to attend what would be Wertham's only panel with an audience of comics fans.

The 1974 show featured a panel on the role of women in comics, with Marie Severin, Flo Steinberg, Jean Thomas (sometime-collaborator with then-husband Roy Thomas), Linda Fite (writer of The Claws of the Cat), and fan representative Irene Vartanoff.

By 1984, as his comic-book distribution business occupied more time, and as other comics conventions, most notably in San Diego and Chicago, became larger, more prominent, and more commercial- rather than fan-driven, Seuling segued the Independence Day-centered Comic Art Convention into the smaller Manhattan Con, which took place in mid-June. Seuling died unexpectedly in August 1984, and the Comic Art Convention/Manhattan Con died with him.

Legacy

The Comic Art Conventions provided the primary nexus for fans and the largely New York City-based industry during the Silver Age and the Bronze Age of comic books. As well, many of the Golden Age creators were still alive and in attendance at panels and for interviews, which helped lay the groundwork for the medium's historical scholarship.

The reputation of the Convention spread throughout fandom via an annual write-up published in The Buyer's Guide to Comics Fandom by columnist Murray Bishoff. Besides reporting on convention events, Bishoff also provided fans around the country with a benchmark market report by surveying attending dealers regarding what was selling and whether prices realized were above or below those quoted in the de facto standard, The Overstreet Comic Book Price Guide.

Will Eisner, creator of the Spirit in 1940, credited the 1971 Comic Art Con for his return to comics. In a 1983 interview with Seuling, he said, "I came back into the field because of you. I remember you calling me in New London, [Connecticut], where I was sitting there as chairman of the board of Croft Publishing Co. My secretary said, 'There's a Mr. Seuling on the phone and he's talking about a comics convention. What is that?' She said, 'I didn't know you were a cartoonist, Mr. Eisner.' 'Oh, yes,' I said, 'secretly; I'm a closet cartoonist.' I came down and was stunned at the existence of the whole world. ... That was a world that I had left, and I found it very exciting, very stimulating".

Eisner later elaborated about meeting underground comics creators and publishers, including Denis Kitchen

Successors 
Following Seuling's death in 1984 and continuing until 1988, Creation Entertainment continued producing large annual conventions in New York City, usually taking place over the weekend following Thanksgiving (Creation had begun hosting New York shows in 1971, and sometimes put on as many as a half-dozen New York City shows per year). From 1993–1995, promoter Fred Greenberg hosted two Great Eastern Conventions annually at venues including the Jacob K. Javits Convention Center and the New York Coliseum. Other companies, including Dynamic Forces, held New York City conventions but all were on a smaller scale than the Seuling shows. Changes in the industry, popular culture, and the resurgent city itself since the troubled 1960s and '70s made large-scale comic-book conventions difficult to hold profitably. Jonah Weiland of ComicBookResources.com also noted that "...dealing with the various convention unions made it difficult for most groups to get a show off the ground."

In 1996, Greenberg, at a very late point, cancelled what had been advertised as a larger-than-usual Great Eastern Conventions show, which the fan press had suggested might herald a successor to the Comic Art Con. As a substitute event, promoter Michael Carbonaro and others on the spur of the moment mounted the first Big Apple Convention in the basement of Manhattan's Church of St. Paul the Apostle. These small shows nonetheless attracted many comics creators and pop-culture figures, and by 2000 the convention had moved to the Metropolitan Pavilion on West 18th Street in Manhattan, and by the mid-2000s were taking place at the Penn Plaza Pavilion at the Hotel Pennsylvania — the same location of the original Comic Art Conventions.

In 2002, the first MoCCA Art Festival, focused on alternative comics and the small press, was held at New York City’s  Puck Building; it has been held annually since. In 2006, the first New York Comic Con was held in the Jacob K. Javits Convention Center; it also has been held annually since.

Dates and locations

Conventions held in New York City unless otherwise noted.

 July 4–7, 1968: Statler Hilton Hotel, 33rd Street and Seventh Avenue — as International Convention of Comic Book Art
 July 4–6, 1969: Statler Hilton Hotel — Penn Top/Sky Top Rooms
 July 3–5, 1970: Statler Hilton Hotel
 July 2–4, 1971: Statler Hilton Hotel
 July 1–5, 1972: Statler Hilton Hotel
 July 4–8, 1973: Commodore Hotel, 42nd Street and Park Avenue
 July 4–8, 1974: Commodore Hotel
 July 3–7, 1975: Commodore Hotel
 July 2–6, 1976: McAlpin Hotel, 34th Street and Broadway
 July 1–5, 1977: Hotel Sheraton, Philadelphia, Pennsylvania (no New York con this year)
 1978:
 July 2–5: Americana Hotel, New York City
 July 8–9: Philadelphia
 1979:
 June 30-July 1: Statler Hilton Hotel, New York City
 July 14–15: Sheraton Hotel, Philadelphia
 July 4–6, 1980: Statler Hilton Hotel
 July 3–5, 1981: Statler Hilton Hotel
 July, 3-5, 1982: Sheraton Hotel, Seventh Ave. and 56th Street, New York City
 July 2–4, 1983: Sheraton Hotel, New York City — as International Science Fiction and Comic Art Convention (presentation of the Saturn Awards)

See also
 Science fiction convention

References

Further reading
 
 1975, 1976, 1977 Comic Art Convention program books
The Comics Journal #46 (May 1979): Convention ad, inside back cover

External links
 "Comic Art Convention" at the Michigan State University Libraries Special Collections Division: Reading Room Index to the Comic Art Collection, "Comi" to "Comic Art of"
 "Philadelphia's 1977 Comic Art Convention", The Comic Treadmill, December 5, 2004..

Defunct comics conventions
Recurring events established in 1968
Conventions in New York City